Bromus commutatus, the meadow brome, is an annual or biennial species of plant in the grass family Poaceae. In the United States it is known as hairy chess.

Description
The panicle is 7–20 cm, usually nodding and often spreading, but erect as first. The leaf-sheaths are hairy, the upper are usually hairless. B. commutatus is stouter than B. racemosus, the smooth brome, with a flower-head not drooping to one side and a broader elongated branched flower head.

Meadow brome structure

Habitat and distribution
It is found in meadows, wasteground, road verges, hayfields and rough grassland. Found throughout the United Kingdom, it is common in England on the moist soils of water meadows; it is rare in Scotland, Ireland and Wales. It is found naturally throughout Europe, N. Africa, W. Asia. It has been introduced into North America and in the United States is known as 'Hairy Chess'. The flowering period is from May to July.

Crop value

The species has no fodder value in the United Kingdom and is regarded as a weed. The attractive inflorescences may be used, either fresh or dry, in flower arrangements.

Varieties
Bromus commutatus var. pubens Wats has spikelets which are not hairless, having soft hairs.

References

Notes

Sources
 Clapham, A. R., Tutin, T. G. & Warburg, E. F. (1987). Excursion Flora of the British Isles. Cambridge : Cambridge University Press. .
 Fitter, R., Fitter, A. and Farrer, A. (1984). Collins Guide to the Grasses, Sedges, Rushes, and Ferns. London : Collins. .
 Hubbard, C. E. (1992). Grasses. Harmondsworth : Penguin Books. 
 McLintock, D. and Fitter, R. S. R. (1982). The Pocket Guide to Wild Flowers. London : Collins. . 
 Phillips, Roger (1980). Grasses, Ferns, Mosses, & Lichens London : Book Club Associates.

External links

Google Images of B. commutatus. Accessed : 2010-06-01

commutatus
Flora of Europe
Flora of Western Asia
Flora of North Africa